Gateway District may refer to:

 Alaska Gateway School District, which coverers the eastern interior of Alaska
 Gateway Regional School District (Massachusetts)
 Gateway District (Minneapolis), Minnesota, United States
 The Gateway (Salt Lake City), Utah, United States
 The Gateway District, a pop punk band from Minneapolis, Minnesota

See also
 Gateway (disambiguation)